Yuzo Kageyama (born 24 December 1935) is a Japanese former equestrian. He competed at the 1960 Summer Olympics and the 1964 Summer Olympics.

References

External links
 

1935 births
Living people
Japanese male equestrians
Olympic equestrians of Japan
Equestrians at the 1960 Summer Olympics
Equestrians at the 1964 Summer Olympics
Sportspeople from Tochigi Prefecture
20th-century Japanese people
21st-century Japanese people